Keemink is a Dutch surname. Notable people with the surname include:
 Henk Keemink, Dutch racewalker
 Wessel Keemink, Dutch volleyball player

Surnames